Allium triquetrum is a bulbous flowering plant in the genus Allium (onions and garlic) native to the Mediterranean basin. It is known in English as three-cornered leek, and in Australia and New Zealand as onion weed. Both the English name and the specific epithet triquetrum refer to the three-cornered shape of the flower stalks.

Description 
Each stem produces an umbel inflorescence of 4–19 flowers in January–May in the species' native environment. The leaves have a distinct onion smell when crushed.

Distribution and habitat 
It has also been introduced to the British Isles, New Zealand, Turkey, Australia, California, Oregon, and South America, and is a declared noxious weed in some of those places. Recorded as an alien at a garden waste site on Howth Head, Ireland.

Culinary uses 

All parts of the plant, from the bulb to the flowers, are edible fresh (for example in pestos) or cooked, with "a subtle flavour like leek or spring onion".

References

External links 

Plants for a Future
Victorian Resources Online
UC/JEPS: Jepson Manual Interchange
Allium triquetrum at Calflora

triquetrum
Onions
Flora of California
Flora of South America
Flora of Europe
Flora of New Zealand
Flora of Australia
Plants described in 1753
Taxa named by Carl Linnaeus